The ampliPHOX Colorimetric Detection Technology was created as a research tool for the analysis of low-density microarrays using colorimetric detection. It combines a reagent kit and a benchtop instrument for detection for low-density (<2500 spots) microarray applications and is produced by InDevR, Inc. The ampliPHOX provides equivalent analytical sensitivity to fluorescence by using colorimetric readout.

The process underlying the ampliPHOX Colorimetric Detection Technology is a light-starting chemical reaction that forms solid polymer spots on the microarray. Biotinylated targets are first captured onto the microarray and subsequently labeled with a streptavidin-coupled initiator. When a proprietary solution is added and light from the ampliPHOX Reader illuminates the array, polymer grows selectively from only locations where the biotinylated targets were captured. The process takes a couple of minutes, and can be seen with the unaided eye and subsequently imaged with the ampliPHOX Reader.

Principles of Operation
The ampliPHOX assay allows for the detection of biotin-labeled targets using light and a proprietary streptavidin-label to start the polymerization of a highly optimized monomer solution (amplify). Transparent polymer is formed only on spots where a labeling event has occurred. The contrast of the polymer is enhanced by applying a simple stain prior to imaging and analysis using the ampliVIEW software. Polymer spots formed are visible to the unaided eye. On the InDevR website, a video is available to illustrate the concept.

Biotin molecules must be incorporated into the microarray target(s) before ampliPHOX detection is performed. This can be achieved using several commercially available or custom options, depending on the particular application.  Brief descriptions of the key steps and features of the ampliPHOX assay and ampliPHOX Reader are given below.

Labeling
Incorporating ampliTAG onto the biotinylated microarray is the first step toward detecting the microarray capture event. Labeling the microarray with amplitude G is performed manually and is not accomplished using the ampliPHOX Reader. The microarray labeling process comprises a five-minute incubation step, followed by a five-minute wash.

Signal Amplification
The amplify solution is applied manually to the labeled microarray and exposed to light using the instrument’s Photoactivation Bay. During photoactivation, the ampliTAG triggers polymerization of the ampliPHY. The result, after excess amplification is removed, is a colorless yet visible polymer present only in regions where targets were labeled with ampliTAG. This polymer is subsequently stained with ampliRED to make the spots visible to the unaided eye and to allow for simple digital imaging and analysis of resulting signals using the ampliPHOX Reader and accompanying ampliVIEW software.

Data Analysis
After the polymer has been stained, the slide is transferred to the instrument’s Imaging Bay for analysis. First, a simple digital image of the array is captured. This image is compiled with other important information about the microarray into a data file with an ARI File Extension.  Once saved, .ARI File Extension can be analyzed using the Analysis Tab within the ampliVIEW software. A target is positive if all spots for the target meet the following criteria:

s > b + 1.8 σb

Where s is the mean spot intensity, b is the mean background intensity (calculated from 48 pixels), and σb is the standard deviation of the background intensity.

Applications
ampliPHOX has been optimized for use with glass microarray substrates and can be used with both nucleic acid and protein-based systems, and, in principle, can detect any biotin-labeled product. Research at the USDA has used this technology to profile Shiga toxin-producing Escherichia coli by identifying the O-antigen gene clusters and virulence genes. Research at InDevR was performed to identify and type Influenza by using ampliPHOX and InDevR's Custom Microarrays with RT-PCR. This work shows that ampliPHOX Detection paired with a low-density microarray can provide a low-cost alternative to methods such as QRT-PCR for surveillance of influenza, particularly in resource-limited settings.

References

Microbiology equipment